Masuiyama Daishirō (3 November 1919 – 21 October 1985) was a sumo wrestler from Himeji, Hyōgo, Japan. His highest rank was ōzeki. After his retirement he was the head coach of Mihogaseki stable and produced yokozuna Kitanoumi among other wrestlers.

Career
Born Kumiaki Sawaka, he joined Dewanoumi stable in 1935 and initially fought under the shikona of Hamanishiki, before changing to Masuiyama in 1937. After winning the makushita tournament championship or yūshō in 1939 he was promoted to jūryō and only two tournaments later, after picking up another championship, he was promoted to the top makuuchi division for the January 1941 tournament. In January 1942 he defeated yokozuna Haguroyama to earn his first gold star or kinboshi. He finished with a losing record but good performances over the next three tournaments took him to komusubi and then sekiwake in 1944. In the first postwar tournament held in a bomb-damaged Kokugikan in June 1945 he could manage only two wins and dropped back to the maegashira ranks, but he was runner-up to Haguroyama in November 1946 with a fine 11–2 record (alongside his stablemate Shionoumi). After earning his first sanshō or special prize for Technique he returned to the san'yaku ranks, and in October 1948 he won his first top division championship. He took advantage of the poor condition of the three yokozuna and finished with a 10–1 record, defeating ōzeki Azumafuji in a playoff. After the tournament Azumafuji was promoted to yokozuna and Masuiyama was elevated to ōzeki. In his second tournament at ōzeki rank Masuiyama took his second and final championship, defeating yokozuna Haguroyama, Azumafuji and Maedayama on three consecutive days to finish 13–2. He defeated maegashira Hajimayama, a fellow member of Dewanoumi stable, in another playoff on the final day.

Retirement from sumo
This was to be the last tourney Masuiyama was to complete. After pulling out of the next two tournaments through injury he retired in January 1950 at the age of 30, having spent only four tournaments at ōzeki rank. He became head coach of the small Mihogaseki stable. After a long period without success, he eventually managed to produce some strong sekitori, including Kitanoumi who reached yokozuna in 1974, and his eldest son, Masuiyama Daishirō II, who was born in 1948, entered his father's stable in 1967 alongside Kitanoumi and reached the ōzeki rank in 1980. In November 1984 Masuiyama reached the mandatory retirement age set by the Japan Sumo Association and passed on control of Mihogaseki stable to his son. He died less than one year later. Kitanoumi, his most successful wrestler, missed his own father's funeral to attend Masuiyama's.

Top division record
Through most of the 1940s only two tournaments were held a year, and in 1946 only one was held.

See also
Glossary of sumo terms
List of past sumo wrestlers
List of sumo tournament top division champions
List of sumo tournament second division champions
List of ōzeki

References

External links
Complete career record

1919 births
1985 deaths
Japanese sumo wrestlers
People from Himeji, Hyōgo
Sumo people from Hyōgo Prefecture
Ōzeki